Bynea railway station serves the village of Bynea near Llanelli, Carmarthenshire, Wales. Bynea station is situated close to the Millennium Coastal Park and is a convenient stop for cyclists and hikers to the coastal area.

All trains serving the station are operated by Transport for Wales.

Facilities
The station is unstaffed and has no permanent buildings (apart from waiting shelters), like neighbouring . CIS displays, a customer help point and timetable poster boards provide running information. No step-free access is available to either platform.

Services
This is a request stop, whereby passengers have to give a hand signal to the approaching train driver to board or notify the guard when they board that they wish to alight from the train there.

References

External links 

Railway stations in Llanelli
DfT Category F2 stations
Former Great Western Railway stations
Railway stations in Great Britain opened in 1840
Heart of Wales Line
Railway stations served by Transport for Wales Rail
Railway request stops in Great Britain